Joe Roland Quintette (also released as Easy Living) is an album by jazz vibraphonist Joe Roland which was released on the Bethlehem label in 1955.

Reception

AllMusic reviewer Scott Yanow described it as "quite worthwhile, mainstream bop of the period... A worthwhile reissue".

Track listing
 "Easy Living" (Ralph Rainger, Leo Robin) – 5:23
 "Stairway to the Steinway" (Freedie Redd) – 3:03
 "Soft Winds" (Benny Goodman) – 2:29
 "Teach Me Tonight" (Gene De Paul, Sammy Cahn) – 2:40
 "Robin" (Ismael Ugarte) – 4:00
 "Sweet Lorraine" (Cliff Burwell, Mitchell Parish) – 3:30
 "Goodbye Bird" (Joe Roland) – 4:20
 "After You've Gone" (Turner Layton, Henry Creamer) – 4:51
 "Anticipation" (Dick Garcia) – 3:50
 "I Cover the Waterfront" (Johnny Green, Edward Heyman) – 3:42
 "The Moon Got in My Eyes" (Arthur Johnston, Johnny Burke) – 1:46
 "Street of Dreams" (Victor Young, Sam M. Lewis) – 2:39

Personnel 
Joe Roland – vibraphone
Freddie Redd - piano
Dick Garcia – guitar
Dante Martucci - bass
Ron Jefferson - drums

References 

1955 albums
Bethlehem Records albums
Joe Roland albums
Albums recorded at Van Gelder Studio
Albums produced by Creed Taylor